Niva or NIVA can refer to:

Places
 Niva (river) in the Murmansk Oblast, Russia
 Nivå, a town in Denmark
 Nivå station, railway station in Denmark
 Niva (Prostějov District), a village in the Czech Republic
 Niva, Iran, a village in Kurdistan Province, Iran

Other
 Lada Niva (VAZ 2121) and Chevrolet Niva (VAZ 2123), a Russian off-road vehicle
 Niva (newspaper), a Polish weekly newspaper in the Belarusian language
 Niva (magazine), a popular 19th-century Russian magazine
 National Independent Venue Association, an organization of independent music venues
 Norwegian Institute for Water Research (NIVA)
 NIVA XM1970 assault rifle prototype
 Niva International School